The term Japanese theorem refers to either of the following two geometrical theorems:

Japanese theorem for cyclic polygons
Japanese theorem for cyclic quadrilaterals